This is a list of concert tours by A Day to Remember, a rock band from Ocala, Florida.

Tours

Notes

References

Sources
 

Day to remember concert tours, A